Dimitrios Mastrovasilis (born 12 June 1983) is a Greek chess grandmaster. He competed in the FIDE World Chess Championship in 2004 and the FIDE World Cup in 2017.

Career 
Mastrovasilis took the silver medal in the under 18 division at the European Youth Chess Championships of 2000. In 2003 Mastrovasilis won the 1st Mediterranean Junior Championship in Ajelat, Libya. The following year he tied for 1st–2nd with Kiril Georgiev at Topola. In 2007 he tied for 2nd–7th with Kiril Georgiev, Vadim Malakhatko, Mircea Pârligras, Hristos Banikas and Dmitry Svetushkin in the Acropolis International Chess Tournament. In 2012 he won the Artemis Cup in Leros.

In team events, Mastrovasilis represented Greece in the Chess Olympiad, the World Team Chess Championship and the European Team Chess Championship. In 2016, he was part of team Europe, which defeated team Poland in the 8th Lublin Union Memorial.

Personal life 
His brother is chess grandmaster Athanasios Mastrovasilis. He is married to Polish Woman Grandmaster Jolanta Zawadzka.

References

External links
Dimitrios Mastrovasilis chess games at 365Chess.com

1983 births
Living people
Chess grandmasters
Greek chess players
Chess Olympiad competitors
Place of birth missing (living people)
Sportspeople from Thessaloniki
21st-century Greek people